Parfenyevsky District is an administrative and municipal district (raion), one of the twenty-four in Kostroma Oblast, Russia. It is located in the center of the oblast. Its administrative center is the rural locality (a selo) of Parfenyevo. Population:  7,857 (2002 Census);  The population of Parfenyevo accounts for 44.9% of the district's total population.

Geography
Parfenyevsky District is located in the center of Kostroma Oblast.  The terrain is flat or slightly hilly, with pine-larch forests (southern taiga) covering 84% of the district, including some old-growth stands of cedars and oak.  Pleistocene glaciation left a landscape of alluvial outwash, moraines, swamps, and lakes.  The upper courses of the Neya River are in the district.  Parfenyevsky District is 150 km northeast of the regional city of Kostroma, and about 480 km northeast of Moscow.  The area measures 75 km (north-south), and 55 km (west-east); total area is 2,460 km2 (about 4.1% of Kostroma Oblast).  The administrative center is the town of Parfenyevo.

The district is bordered on the north by Chukhlomsky District and Kologrivsky District, on the east by Neysky District, and on the southwest by Antropovsky District.

History
Historical records suggest that Parfenyevo was founded in 1521 as a fortress in the Kazan line, which protected Moscow from invasion by Tatars and Cheremis (Mari people).  The town was on a main trade route to the Vyatka Region and Siberia, and in 1707 was included into the Arkhangelsk region.  It was formally formed into a district of Kostroma Oblast in 1929.  The economy of the area is centered on logging and woodworking.

References

Notes

Sources

Districts of Kostroma Oblast